is a Shinto Shrine in Takamori, Kumamoto Prefecture, Japan. This shrine is famous for being the setting of a popular anime and manga comic Hotarubi no Mori e.

History
The history of this shrine is unknown. It is said that the shrine started to offer ritual service in 14th century. According to local legend, Kamishikimi Kumanoimasu Shrine is dedicated to the creator gods Izanagi-no-Mikoto and Izanami-no-Mikoto from Japanese mythology.

The original shrine was burned down by the flames of war in 16th century and current shrine was rebuilt in 1722. The shrine is believed to bring good luck in marriage.

Ugeto-iwa stone
Behind the main hall is a large sacred stone called Ugeto-iwa;  in Japanese mythology it was  kicked and a 10-meter hole was made  by Kihachi, a follower of the god Takeiwatatsu-no-mikoto, who created  Mount Aso. It's thought worshiping there brings success and victory.

Gallery

References 

Shinto shrines in Kumamoto Prefecture
 Important Cultural Properties of Japan